Thomas or Tom Geoffrey Sackville (born 26 October 1950) is a British Conservative politician and anti-cultist.

Family and early life
Sackville is the second son of William Sackville, 10th Earl De La Warr (died February 1988) and Anne Rachel Devas, and his brother is William Herbrand Sackville, the 11th Earl De La Warr.

In 1979, he married Catherine Thérèsa Windsor-Lewis, daughter of Brigadier James Charles Windsor-Lewis. They have two children, Arthur Michael Sackville (born 1983) and Savannah Elizabeth Sackville (born 1986), both adopted.

He was educated at Eton College and Lincoln College, Oxford, and he began his professional career in merchant banking.

Parliamentary career
Sackville first ran for Parliament in the constituency of Pontypool in the 1979 election, being beaten by Labour's Leo Abse.

He served as a Conservative Member of Parliament for Bolton West from the 1983 election until he was defeated by Ruth Kelly in the 1997 election. He held the office of Parliamentary Under-Secretary of State between 1992 and 1997, initially for the Department of Health, then as a Home Office minister between 1995 and 1997.

Anti-cult activities
In 1985 he started All-Party Committee Against Cults and 20 October 2000 he became first chairman of The Family Survival Trust (formerly Family, Action, Information, Rescue/Resource or FAIR), an anti-cult organisation.

In 1997 he ended government funding for the independent research group Information Network Focus on Religious Movements (INFORM), created by sociologist Eileen Barker. Funds were reinstated in 2000. In his article for The Spectator (2004) he accused INFORM and its president Eileen Barker of "refusing to criticise the worst excesses of cult leaders", and congratulated the Archbishop of Canterbury for declining to become a patron of INFORM. The allegations were described by INFORM as unfounded.

In 2005 he was elected as vice-president of European Federation of Centres of Research and Information on Sectarianism (FECRIS), an umbrella organization for anti-cult groups in Europe, and from 2009 he has served as its president.

Sackville is the current CEO of the International Federation of Health Plans. He is also the current chairman of the trustees of the Family Survival Trust.

See also
Family Survival Trust
FECRIS

References

External links 

1950 births
Living people
Alumni of Lincoln College, Oxford
Conservative Party (UK) MPs for English constituencies
People educated at Eton College
UK MPs 1983–1987
UK MPs 1987–1992
UK MPs 1992–1997
Younger sons of earls
Critics of new religious movements
Members of the Parliament of the United Kingdom for Bolton West